The Value-Jet Remo Ultra Marathon race is Nigeria's first Ultramarathon race, comprising athletes from various part of the world

History
In 2017, Value-Jet announce a sponsor deal with the race.  It was organized by Kunle Soname.

References

Athletics competitions in Nigeria